Penrhos Cottage is a very small cottage situated to the south east of Maenclochog. It was built as a ty un nos (house built in one night) around 1800, later rebuilt in stone, and last occupied in 1967. The typical North Pembrokeshire thatched cottage was once home to a family of 12, and is almost unchanged since the 19th century, having retained its original Welsh oak furniture. It is the last thatched cottage in Pembrokeshire.

References 
http://www.pembrokeshirevirtualmuseum.co.uk/main_menu/places_to_visit/museums/penrhos/index.html

External links
Photograph

Buildings and structures in Pembrokeshire
Museums in Pembrokeshire
Historic house museums in Wales